The Sri Lanka national under-17 football team is the under-17 football (soccer) team of Sri Lanka. The team participates in the U-16 football competitions in international football and is controlled by the Football Federation of Sri Lanka. The team has never qualified for the FIFA U-17 World Cup or the AFC U-16 Championship.

History 
In 1998, the team played against the Bangladesh national under-17 football team in the qualifiers for the AFC U-16 Championship, but lost 4-0. The team won its first international game against the Guam national under-18 football team in that competition by a score of 8-0. The Sri Lankan team also participated in the  qualifiers but failed to win a single game.

Tournament records

FIFA U-17 World Cup

AFC U-16 Championship

SAFF U-16 Championship

Fixtures and results

2015

2017

See also
Sri Lanka national football team
Sri Lanka women's national football team
Sri Lanka national under-23 football team
Sri Lanka national under-20 football team

References

External links
 Official website
 Sri Lanka national football team on FIFA

under-17
Asian national under-17 association football teams